The PSL Coach of the season in South African football

References

Premier Soccer League
South Africa
South African sports trophies and awards